is a passenger railway station located in the city of Inagi, Tokyo, Japan, operated by East Japan Railway Company (JR East).

Lines
Minami-Tama Station is served by the Nambu Line, and is situated 25.5 km from the terminus of the line at Kawasaki Station.

Station layout
The station consists of one elevated island platform, with the station building located underneath. The station is staffed.

Platforms

History
The station opened on 1 November 1927. With the privatization of JNR on 1 April 1987, the station came under the control of JR East.

Passenger statistics
In fiscal 2019, the station was used by an average of 6,814 passengers daily (boarding passengers only).

The passenger figures for previous years are as shown below.

Surrounding area
 Suntory Products Tamagawa Plant
 Nippon Filcon (Headquarters / Tokyo Office)
 Inagi Municipal Hospital
 Inagi City Central Library

See also
List of railway stations in Japan

References

External links

  

Stations of East Japan Railway Company
Railway stations in Tokyo
Railway stations in Japan opened in 1927
Nambu Line
Inagi, Tokyo